Bous can refer to:
Bous (Bithynia), a town of ancient Bithynia, now in Turkey
Bous, Luxembourg, a municipality in Luxembourg
Bous, Germany, a municipality in Saarland, Germany
Váli (son of Odin), a figure in Norse mythology also known as "Bous"